Elisabet Cesáreo Romero (born 25 May 1999) is a Spanish handball player for french club JDA Dijon Bourgogne Handball and the Spanish national team.

In September 2018, she made her senior Spain squad debut for two friendly matches. Two months later, she participated in her first major international competition, the 2018 European Women's Handball Championship.

She represented Spain at the 2019 World Women's Handball Championship during which Spain won the silver medal.

Achievements

Club
Spanish league (Liga Guerreras Iberdrola / División de Honor):
Winner: 2020, 2021, 2022 (with BM Bera Bera)

International
Olympic Games
2020: 9th
World Championship
2019:  Silver
2021: 4th
European Championship
2018: 12th

References

External links

Living people
1999 births
Spanish female handball players
People from Sant Joan Despí
Sportspeople from the Province of Barcelona
Handball players from Catalonia
Handball players at the 2020 Summer Olympics